The finals and the qualifying heats of the men's 50 metre freestyle event at the 1998 World Aquatics Championships were held on Saturday 17 January 1998 in Perth, Western Australia.

Heats

B Final

A Final

See also
Swimming at the 1996 Summer Olympics – Men's 50 metre freestyle (Atlanta)
1997 FINA Short Course World Championships – Men's 50m Freestyle (Gothenburg)
Swimming at the 1997 European Aquatics Championships – Men's 50 metre freestyle (Seville)
Swimming at the 2000 Summer Olympics – Men's 50 metre freestyle (Sydney)

References

Swimming at the 1998 World Aquatics Championships